These are the Oricon number one albums of 2003, per the Oricon Albums Chart.

Chart history

Trivia
Number-one album of 2003: Second to None by Chemistry.
Most weeks at number-one: HY with a total of 4 weeks.

See also
2003 in music

External links
https://web.archive.org/web/20141021000023/http://www.geocities.jp/object_ori/indexa.html

2003 record charts
Lists of number-one albums in Japan
2003 in Japanese music